Anne Manne (née Robinson; born 1955) is an Australian journalist and social philosopher.

Her 2005 book Motherhood: How should we care for our children? was short-listed in 2006 for Australian journalism's Walkley Award.  

Anne Manne has been married to Australian political science professor Robert Manne since 1983. They have two children, including Cornell University philosophy professor Kate Manne.

Bibliography

Books

Essays and reporting
 
 
 
 
 
 
 , The Monthly, Issue 53, February 2010, pp. 36–42.
 , The Monthly, Issue 23, May 2007, pp. 32–39
 , The Monthly, Issue 19, December 2006 - January 2007, pp. 34–42
 , The Monthly, Issue 13, June 2006, pp. 30–35

Critical studies and reviews of Manne's work
  Review of The life of I.
  Review of The life of I.

References

1955 births
Living people
Australian journalists
Australian women writers
The Monthly people
Quadrant (magazine) people